The 40th (The King's) Royal Tank Regiment (40 RTR) was an armoured regiment of the British Army from 1938 until 1956. It was part of the Royal Tank Regiment, itself part of the Royal Armoured Corps.

It was originally formed by converting the 7th Battalion, King's Regiment (Liverpool), a Territorial Army infantry battalion that recruited mainly in the Bootle area, to a tank unit.

Equipped with Vickers Valentine tanks, the regiment served with the 23rd Armoured Brigade in North Africa. Under the command of Lieutenant Colonel J.L. Finigan it fought at El Alamein and acquired the nickname "Monty's Foxhounds" during the long pursuit of the Afrika Korps and the Italian Army across Egypt and Libya and into Tunisia. It later served in the Italian Campaign and then in Greece during the Greek Civil War.

The Regiment was placed in suspended animation in mid-1946, and then reconstituted at Liverpool as an armoured regiment of the Territorial Army in 1947. In recognition of its services in North Africa, Vickers Engineering presented Colonel Finigan with a silver model of the Valentine which still serves as a centrepiece when former officers of the Regiment and its successor dine formally together. In 1956, the Regiment amalgamated with the 41st (Oldham) Royal Tank Regiment to form the 40th/41st Royal Tank Regiment.

References

External links
Royal Tank Regiment 1946-2005 (PDF)

4-040 The King's Royal Tank Regiment
King's Regiment (Liverpool)
Military units and formations in Lancashire
Military units and formations in Liverpool
Military units and formations established in 1938
Military units and formations disestablished in 1956